The Wolf Prize in Arts is awarded annually by the not-for-profit Wolf Foundation in Israel. It is one of the six Wolf Prizes established by the Foundation, and has been awarded since 1981; the others are in Agriculture, Chemistry, Mathematics, Medicine and Physics, awarded since 1978. The Prize rotates annually among painting, music, architecture and sculpture.

Laureates
Source:

Laureates per country 
Below is a chart of all laureates per country (updated to 2023 laureates). Some laureates are counted more than once if have multiple citizenship.

Notes and references 

 Wolf Prizes 2015 
 Wolf Prizes 2016
 Wolf Prizes 2018
 Wolf Prize 2020

Architecture awards
International art awards
Israeli music awards
Arts
Lists of Israeli award winners
Awards established in 1981
Arts awards in Israel
1981 establishments in Israel